Atropos is one of the three goddesses of fate and destiny in Greek mythology.

Atropos may refer also to:
 Atropos (Goya), an 1819-23 painting by Francisco de Goya
 Atropos (journal), a British entomology journal 
A taxonomic synonym for Atropoides, a.k.a. jumping pitvipers, a genus of venomous snakes found in Mexico and Central America
 A taxonomic synonym for Trimeresurus, a.k.a. Asian pit vipers, a genus of venomous snakes found in Asia
 273 Atropos, an asteroid
 HMS Atropos, a fictional ship commanded by Horatio Hornblower
 In chemistry, as a shorthand for atropisomer, which is a stereoisomer resulting from hindered rotation about a single bond